Orange soft drinks (called orange pop or orange soda in certain regions of the United States and Canada, orangeade in the UK, or the genericized trademark Orangina in France) are carbonated orange drinks.

Non-carbonated orange drinks, i.e. the orange-juice-flavored equivalent of lemonade, are also made, with brands such as Minute Maid, and blends like cherry orangeade and lemon-orangeade are also made in some places, with recipes being commonly available.

Orange soft drinks (especially those without orange juice) often contain very high levels of sodium benzoate, and this often imparts a slight metallic taste to the beverage. Other additives commonly found in orange soft drinks include glycerol ester of wood rosin, brominated vegetable oil,  and sodium hexametaphosphate.

History

Orangeade first appeared as a variety of carbonated drink provided in soda fountains in American drugstores in the late 19th century, brands including Miner's and Lash's. A recipe for homemade orangeade appears in editions of Fannie Farmer's cookbook.

List of brands

 Appelsín, a popular soft drink from Iceland
 Aranciata from San Pellegrino
 AriZona
 Asina Orange Soda from Norway
 Barr Orangeade
 Cactus Cooler (orange-pineapple)
 Cadbury Schweppes
 Celeste soda orange soda
 Cplus orange soda (Canada)
 Crush
 Dr. Brown's orange soda
 Donald Duck orange soda
 Fanta
 Faygo
 Frost King
 Golf Orange is a local orange soft drink brand from Serbia produced by Knjaz Miloš.
 Gold Spot (India)
 Green Spot (soft drink) 
 Hellena Oranżada, Poland
 Jaffa, popular in Sweden and Finland
 Jarritos, Barrilitos and other Mexican soft drink brands make orange- or mandarina-flavored soda.
 Jianlibao（Chinese sport drink populated during 1980s and 1990s）
 Jones Soda Co.
 Kas Naranja (made by PepsiCo in Spain, Mexico, and France)
 Kist orange soda made in Chicago, Illinois
 Lorina
 Minute Maid orange soda (bottled by Coca-Cola) 
 Mirinda Orange
 MiWadi
 Mountain Dew LiveWire (made by Pepsi)
 Naranjada (made by Postobón in Colombia)
 Nehi
 Nesbitt's
 Orange Cheerio (Japan)
 Orange Dream (made by Sprecher Brewery)
 Orangette (marketed by Walmart)
 Orangina
 Royal Crown
 Royal Tru-Orange (Philippines)
 Schin Laranja (Orange soda bottled by Schincariol in Brazil)
 Sisi (Netherlands)
 Slice
 Solo (Norway)
 Stewart's Orange'n Cream
 Sukita (Brazil)
 Sumol (Portugal)
 Sunkist
 Tango
 TruAde
 Tuborg Squash (Danish orange flavored soda bottled by Carlsberg)
 Whistle
 Yedigün (made by PepsiCo in Turkey)
 Zingo

See also

 Ade (drink suffix)
 List of brand name soft drinks products
 List of soft drink flavors
 List of soft drinks by country
 Orange (fruit)
 Orange drink
 Orange juice
 Soft drink

References

Non-alcoholic drinks
 
Soft drink flavors